The Gross Litzner (also spelled Großlitzner in German) is a mountain in the Silvretta Alps, located on the border between Austria and Switzerland.

References

External links
 Gross Litzner on Hikr.org

Mountains of the Alps
Mountains of Graubünden
Mountains of Vorarlberg
Alpine three-thousanders
Austria–Switzerland border
International mountains of Europe
Mountains of Switzerland
Silvretta Alps
Klosters-Serneus